Kanchanamala Cable TV (c/o Juvvala palem) is a 2005 Indian Telugu-language comedy film directed by Pardha Sarathi and starring  Srikanth and newcomer Lakshmi Rai.

Cast 

Srikanth as Sudarshan, the founder of Kanchanamala Cable TV in Juvvalapalem
Lakshmi Rai as Sireesha, who pretends to be Sudarshan's nephew Kanchanamala
Tanikella Bharani as the criminal lawyer
Satyanarayana as  Kanchanamala's father
Annapurna as Kanchanamala's mother
Sunil, Sivaji Raja, and Preeti as Sudarshan's assistants
Krishna Bhagavaan, M. S. Narayana and Raghu Babu as the people who run the rival cable network
Brahmanandam
Ali
Venu Madhav
Kondavalasa
Bandla Ganesh
 Sarika Ramachandra Rao
 Rama Lakshmanulu
 Harika
 Lavanya
 Deepanjali
Manoja
Allari Subhashini
Rajitha

Production 
Director Pardha Sarathi made his directorial debut with this film. The film was shot in Koduru and Poduru villages. The film's shoot was almost completed in June 2005.

Soundtrack 
Anand fame  K.M. Radha Krishnan composed the film's songs. The lyrics were written by Chandrabose, Veturi and Sahithi. Three were shot near Palakol and two in Kerala. Hindustan Times called the soundtrack "an all-round album".

"Kanchanamala" – Sandeep, Srikanth, Lalitha Sagar
"Kantlo Kaaveri" – Karthik, Harini
"Krishna Kolatalu" – Shankar Mahadevan, Kalpana
"Nadiridinna" – Shankar Mahadevan, Kalpana
"O Neelaveni" – SPB, Chitra
"Saiyya Ante" – Lalitha Sagar

Release 
A critic from The Hindu opined that “The storyline is water thin but the director turns it into a neat film. One can happily watch with family”. Jeevi of Idlebrain said that “On a whole Kanchanamala Cable TV disappoints”. Sify said that "On the whole Kanchanamala Cable TV lacks story, logic and moves at snail pace". A critic from Webindia wrote that "Parthasarathy shows good taste in the visuals but he should understand that the plot is predominant and comedy cannot replace it".

References

External links 

2000s Telugu-language films
Films scored by K. M. Radha Krishnan